Yenice station is a railway station in Yenice, Mersin. Yenice station is on the busy Adana-Mersin Main Line. The station was built in 1886 by the Mersin-Tarsus-Adana Railway.

Historical Importance

Historical Meeting between the Turkish president İsmet İnönü and British prime minister Winston Churchill was held in Yenice Station during the Second World War. There is a bill board about this meeting in the station building.

References

External links
 

Railway stations in Mersin Province
Railway stations opened in 1886
Buildings and structures in Mersin Province
Transport in Mersin Province